In mathematics, vector bundles on algebraic curves may be studied as holomorphic vector bundles on compact Riemann surfaces, which is the classical approach, or as locally free sheaves on algebraic curves C in a more general, algebraic setting (which can for example admit singular points).

Some foundational results on classification were known in the 1950s.

 gave the classification of vector bundles on elliptic curves.

Although, associated ruled surfaces were classical objects. See Hirzebruch–Riemann–Roch theorem for his result. He was seeking a generalization of the Jacobian variety, by passing from holomorphic line bundles to higher rank. This idea would prove fruitful, in terms of moduli spaces of vector bundles. following on the work in the 1960s on geometric invariant theory.

See also
Hitchin system

References
 Also in Collected Works vol. I

Algebraic curves
Vector bundles